The Independence Community College Pirates are the sports teams of Independence Community College located in Independence, Kansas, United States. They participate in the NJCAA and in the Kansas Jayhawk Community College Conference.  The men's football team was featured on the third and fourth seasons of the television documentary "Last Chance U."

Sports
Men's sports
Baseball
Basketball
Football
Golf
Soccer

Women's sports
Basketball
Cheer and dance
Soccer
Softball
Volleyball

Facilities
Independence Community College has six athletics facilities.
 Emerson Field – home of the Pirates baseball team
 Emmot Field – home of the Pirates football team
 Fieldhouse – home of the Pirates men's and women's basketball teams, and the volleyball team
 Independence Country Club – home of the Pirates golf team
 The Field – home of the Pirates soccer teams
 Volunteer Field – home of the Lady Pirates softball team

Notable alumni

 Armen Gilliam, former NBA player
 Harvey Grant, former NBA player
 William Inge,  playwright and novelist
 Bobby Johnson, former NFL wide receiver, New York Giants
 Jermaine Johnson II, NFL defensive end
 Emmanuel Lamur, NFL linebacker, Cincinnati Bengals
 Bruce McCray, NFL defensive back
 Ron Parker, NFL cornerback, Kansas City Chiefs
 Allen Patrick, NFL running back
 Ruben Patterson, former basketball player
 Tarik Phillip (born 1993), British-American basketball player in the Israel Basketball Premier League
 Reggie Rembert, former NFL wide receiver, Cincinnati Bengals, New York Jets
 Antwoine Sanders, former football safety
 Brad Underwood, men's basketball coach, Illinois, Oklahoma State, Stephen F. Austin
 Ron Warner, former NFL defensive end, New Orleans Saints, Tampa Bay Buccaneers and Washington Redskins

References

External links
 

Sports teams in Kansas